The 1974 Philadelphia Phillies season was the 92nd season in franchise history. The Phillies finished in third place in the National League East with a record of 80 wins and 82 losses. They would not finish below .500 again until going 75–87 in 1985.

Offseason 
 December 6, 1973: Denny Doyle was sent by the Phillies to the California Angels, and Aurelio Monteagudo and Chris Coletta were sent by the Angels to the Phillies to complete an earlier deal (the Phillies sent a player to be named later to the Angels for players to be named later and Billy Grabarkewitz) made on August 14.
 December 19, 1973: Tony Taylor was signed as a free agent by the Phillies.

Regular season 
Third baseman Mike Schmidt had a breakout season in 1974, leading the National League in home runs and demonstrating his prowess in the field. On June 10, Schmidt hit what many felt should have been a home run when the ball hit the public address speaker that hung 117 feet above and 329 feet away from home plate at the Astrodome in Houston. The ball hit the speaker, fell to the field, and, by the Astrodome's ground rules, remained in play. Since Schmidt had already started his slow home run trot, he was held to a single. (There were runners on first and second when the ball was hit, and they each advanced only one base.) Many experts agree the ball would have traveled in excess of 500 feet.

The Phillies became the first team to lead the division at the All-Star break after finishing last in the division one year ago.

Season standings

Record vs. opponents

Notable transactions 
 June 5, 1974: 1974 Major League Baseball draft
Derek Botelho was drafted by the Phillies in the 26th round, but did not sign.
Ken Phelps was drafted by the Phillies in the 1st round (19th pick) of the secondary phase, but did not sign.
 June 15, 1974: Jeff Schneider was signed as an amateur free agent by the Phillies.
 July 2, 1974: John Poff was signed as an amateur free agent by the Phillies.

Game log

|- style="background:#bfb"
| 1 || April 6 || Mets || 5–4 || Mac Scarce (1–0) || Tug McGraw (0–1) || None || 40,222 || 1–0
|- style="background:#fbb"
| 2 || April 7 || Mets || 2–9 || Jon Matlack (1–0) || Jim Lonborg (0–1) || Tug McGraw (1) || 16,441 || 1–1
|- style="background:#fbb"
| 3 || April 9 || @ Cubs || 0–2 || Bill Bonham (1–0) || Ron Schueler (0–1) || None || 30,601 || 1–2
|- style="background:#fbb"
| 4 || April 10 || @ Cubs || 6–7 || Ray Burris (1–0) || Mac Scarce (1–1) || None || 6,535 || 1–3
|- style="background:#bfb"
| 5 || April 11 || @ Cubs || 4–3 || Frank Linzy (1–0) || Horacio Piña (0–1) || Eddie Watt (1) || 2,292 || 2–3
|- style="background:#bbb"
| – || April 13 || @ Mets || colspan=6 | Postponed (rain); Makeup: April 14 as a traditional double-header
|- style="background:#bfb"
| 6 || April 14 (1) || @ Mets || 2–1 (11) || Mike Wallace (1–0) || Tug McGraw (0–2) || None || see 2nd game || 3–3
|- style="background:#bfb"
| 7 || April 14 (2) || @ Mets || 5–3 || Mac Scarce (2–1) || Bob Miller (0–1) || None || 14,201 || 4–3
|- style="background:#bfb"
| 8 || April 15 || Cardinals || 3–2 || Dick Ruthven (1–0) || Alan Foster (0–1) || Mac Scarce (1) || 6,713 || 5–3
|- style="background:#bfb"
| 9 || April 16 || Cardinals || 10–3 || Steve Carlton (1–0) || Bob Gibson (0–1) || None || 8,107 || 6–3
|- style="background:#bfb"
| 10 || April 17 || Cardinals || 12–5 || George Culver (1–0) || Sonny Siebert (1–1) || None || 11,237 || 7–3
|- style="background:#fbb"
| 11 || April 18 || Cardinals || 2–6 || Lynn McGlothen (2–0) || Ron Schueler (0–2) || None || 8,106 || 7–4
|- style="background:#bfb"
| 12 || April 19 || Cubs || 9–2 || Jim Lonborg (1–1) || Bill Bonham (1–2) || None || 12,318 || 8–4
|- style="background:#fbb"
| 13 || April 20 || Cubs || 4–5 (13) || Ray Burris (2–0) || Mac Scarce (2–2) || None || 16,534 || 8–5
|- style="background:#bfb"
| 14 || April 21 || Cubs || 7–3 || Steve Carlton (2–0) || Burt Hooton (1–1) || None || 17,172 || 9–5
|- style="background:#fbb"
| 15 || April 23 || @ Dodgers || 3–5 || Jim Brewer (2–0) || Frank Linzy (1–1) || None || 14,984 || 9–6
|- style="background:#fbb"
| 16 || April 24 || @ Dodgers || 1–6 || Don Sutton (4–1) || Jim Lonborg (1–2) || None || 14,756 || 9–7
|- style="background:#fbb"
| 17 || April 25 || @ Dodgers || 0–1 || Tommy John (5–0) || Dick Ruthven (1–1) || None || 15,117 || 9–8
|- style="background:#fbb"
| 18 || April 26 || @ Padres || 2–6 || Dave Freisleben (1–0) || Steve Carlton (2–1) || None || 9,448 || 9–9
|- style="background:#fbb"
| 19 || April 27 || @ Padres || 2–5 || Randy Jones (2–4) || Ron Schueler (0–3) || None || 31,407 || 9–10
|- style="background:#fbb"
| 20 || April 28 || @ Padres || 4–5 || Larry Hardy (1–0) || Frank Linzy (1–2) || None || 12,031 || 9–11
|- style="background:#bfb"
| 21 || April 30 || @ Giants || 6–5 || Frank Linzy (2–2) || Randy Moffitt (1–2) || Eddie Watt (2) || 2,188 || 10–11
|-

|- style="background:#fbb"
| 22 || May 1 || @ Giants || 8–13 || Charlie Williams (1–0) || Steve Carlton (2–2) || None || 2,179 || 10–12
|- style="background:#bfb"
| 23 || May 3 || Dodgers || 2–1 || Ron Schueler (1–3) || Doug Rau (2–1) || Eddie Watt (3) || 20,186 || 11–12
|- style="background:#bfb"
| 24 || May 4 || Dodgers || 7–3 || Jim Lonborg (2–2) || Don Sutton (4–2) || None || 40,301 || 12–12
|- style="background:#bfb"
| 25 || May 5 || Dodgers || 3–2 || Mac Scarce (3–2) || Tommy John (5–1) || None || 41,040 || 13–12
|- style="background:#fbb"
| 26 || May 6 || Padres || 6–7 || Dave Freisleben (3–0) || Steve Carlton (2–3) || Rich Troedson (1) || 4,149 || 13–13
|- style="background:#fbb"
| 27 || May 7 || Padres || 3–5 (13) || Mike Corkins (2–0) || Dave Wallace (0–1) || None || 4,288 || 13–14
|- style="background:#bfb"
| 28 || May 8 || Padres || 4–0 || Jim Lonborg (3–2) || Randy Jones (2–6) || None || 5,081 || 14–14
|- style="background:#bfb"
| 29 || May 10 || Pirates || 3–2 || Dick Ruthven (2–1) || Ken Brett (2–3) || Mac Scarce (2) || 16,388 || 15–14
|- style="background:#bfb"
| 30 || May 11 || Pirates || 3–1 || Steve Carlton (3–3) || Bob Moose (1–4) || None || 21,070 || 16–14
|- style="background:#bfb"
| 31 || May 12 || Pirates || 8–7 || Ed Farmer (1–0) || Dock Ellis (1–3) || Eddie Watt (4) || 11,243 || 17–14
|- style="background:#fbb"
| 32 || May 14 || Expos || 2–9 || Steve Rogers (6–1) || Jim Lonborg (3–3) || None || 8,413 || 17–15
|- style="background:#fbb"
| 33 || May 15 || Expos || 4–5 || Tom Walker (1–0) || Mac Scarce (3–3) || None || 10,105 || 17–16
|- style="background:#bfb"
| 34 || May 16 || Expos || 6–3 || Steve Carlton (4–3) || Mike Torrez (3–3) || None || 7,311 || 18–16
|- style="background:#bbb"
| – || May 17 || @ Pirates || colspan=6 | Postponed (rain); Makeup: May 19 as a traditional double-header
|- style="background:#bfb"
| 35 || May 18 || @ Pirates || 9–2 || Ron Schueler (2–3) || Bob Moose (1–5) || None || 8,021 || 19–16
|- style="background:#bfb"
| 36 || May 19 (1) || @ Pirates || 3–2 || Jim Lonborg (4–3) || Dock Ellis (1–4) || Eddie Watt (5) || see 2nd game || 20–16
|- style="background:#fbb"
| 37 || May 19 (2) || @ Pirates || 1–2 || Jerry Reuss (2–3) || Dick Ruthven (2–2) || None || 13,426 || 20–17
|- style="background:#bfb"
| 38 || May 20 || @ Cardinals || 2–1 || Steve Carlton (5–3) || Lynn McGlothen (5–2) || None || 12,326 || 21–17
|- style="background:#bfb"
| 39 || May 21 || @ Cardinals || 4–2 || Ed Farmer (2–0) || John Curtis (2–5) || Mac Scarce (3) || 11,481 || 22–17
|- style="background:#bfb"
| 40 || May 22 || @ Cardinals || 7–1 || Ron Schueler (3–3) || Alan Foster (1–4) || None || 10,587 || 23–17
|- style="background:#fbb"
| 41 || May 24 || Expos || 2–4 || Ernie McAnally (3–4) || Jim Lonborg (4–4) || None || 14,131 || 23–18
|- style="background:#bfb"
| 42 || May 25 (1) || Expos || 4–3 || Eddie Watt (1–0) || Mike Torrez (4–4) || None || see 2nd game || 24–18
|- style="background:#bfb"
| 43 || May 25 (2) || Expos || 4–2 || Steve Carlton (6–3) || Steve Renko (3–5) || None || 41,350 || 25–18
|- style="background:#fbb"
| 44 || May 26 || Expos || 1–5 || Dennis Blair (1–0) || Ron Schueler (3–4) || None || 27,324 || 25–19
|- style="background:#fbb"
| 45 || May 27 || @ Braves || 1–9 || Phil Niekro (6–3) || Ed Farmer (2–1) || None || 6,446 || 25–20
|- style="background:#fbb"
| 46 || May 28 || @ Braves || 1–2 (10) || Danny Frisella (1–2) || Jim Lonborg (4–5) || None || see 2nd game || 25–21
|- style="background:#fbb"
| 47 || May 29 || @ Braves || 0–1 (11) || Tom House (1–0) || Steve Carlton (6–4) || None || 7,816 || 25–22
|- style="background:#fbb"
| 48 || May 31 || Giants || 2–6 || Ron Bryant (2–4) || Ron Schueler (3–5) || Randy Moffitt (12) || 23,513 || 25–23
|-

|- style="background:#bfb"
| 49 || June 1 || Giants || 6–2 || Jim Lonborg (5–5) || Mike Caldwell (7–3) || None || 20,167 || 26–23
|- style="background:#bfb"
| 50 || June 2 || Giants || 4–3 || Frank Linzy (3–2) || Randy Moffitt (2–3) || None || 12,280 || 27–23
|- style="background:#bfb"
| 51 || June 3 || Braves || 5–2 || Steve Carlton (7–4) || Carl Morton (6–5) || None || 44,179 || 28–23
|- style="background:#fbb"
| 52 || June 4 || Braves || 3–7 || Roric Harrison (4–6) || Ron Schueler (3–6) || Tom House (3) || 17,197 || 28–24
|- style="background:#bfb"
| 53 || June 5 || Braves || 4–2 || Jim Lonborg (6–5) || Phil Niekro (6–4) || None || 26,204 || 29–24
|- style="background:#fbb"
| 54 || June 7 || Reds || 4–7 || Pedro Borbón (5–3) || Mac Scarce (3–4) || None || 22,408 || 29–25
|- style="background:#bfb"
| 55 || June 8 || Reds || 6–5 || Steve Carlton (8–4) || Clay Carroll (3–1) || None || 34,256 || 30–25
|- style="background:#fbb"
| 56 || June 9 || Reds || 7–14 || Don Gullett (6–3) || Wayne Twitchell (0–1) || None || 33,163 || 30–26
|- style="background:#bfb"
| 57 || June 10 || @ Astros || 12–0 || Jim Lonborg (7–5) || Claude Osteen (5–6) || None || 9,487 || 31–26
|- style="background:#fbb"
| 58 || June 11 || @ Astros || 1–10 || Larry Dierker (4–3) || Dick Ruthven (2–3) || None || 10,034 || 31–27
|- style="background:#bfb"
| 59 || June 12 || @ Astros || 3–0 || Steve Carlton (9–4) || Don Wilson (3–4) || None || 12,010 || 32–27
|- style="background:#fbb"
| 60 || June 14 || @ Reds || 4–7 || Don Gullett (7–3) || Ron Schueler (3–7) || None || 25,238 || 32–28
|- style="background:#bfb"
| 61 || June 15 || @ Reds || 5–2 || Jim Lonborg (8–5) || Jack Billingham (6–5) || None || 35,732 || 33–28
|- style="background:#fbb"
| 62 || June 16 || @ Reds || 0–5 || Clay Carroll (4–1) || Dick Ruthven (2–4) || None || 30,006 || 33–29
|- style="background:#bfb"
| 63 || June 17 || Astros || 7–5 || Wayne Twitchell (1–1) || Claude Osteen (5–7) || None || 18,289 || 34–29
|- style="background:#fbb"
| 64 || June 18 || Astros || 0–1 || Mike Cosgrove (2–0) || Ron Schueler (3–8) || None || 14,165 || 34–30
|- style="background:#bfb"
| 65 || June 19 || Astros || 5–4 || Jim Lonborg (9–5) || Tom Griffin (7–3) || Mac Scarce (4) || 17,161 || 35–30
|- style="background:#fbb"
| 66 || June 20 || Mets || 1–2 || Jerry Koosman (7–4) || Dick Ruthven (2–5) || None || 22,210 || 35–31
|- style="background:#fbb"
| 67 || June 21 || Mets || 1–3 || Tom Seaver (4–6) || Steve Carlton (9–5) || Tug McGraw (2) || 28,262 || 35–32
|- style="background:#bfb"
| 68 || June 22 (1) || Mets || 5–2 || Ron Schueler (4–8) || Harry Parker (1–7) || None || see 2nd game || 36–32
|- style="background:#bfb"
| 69 || June 22 (2) || Mets || 8–5 || Wayne Twitchell (2–1) || George Stone (2–6) || Jesús Hernáiz (1) || 51,197 || 37–32
|- style="background:#bbb"
| – || June 23 || Mets || colspan=6 | Postponed (rain); Makeup: September 25 as a traditional double-header
|- style="background:#bfb"
| 70 || June 24 || @ Expos || 8–2 || Jim Lonborg (10–5) || Mike Torrez (7–5) || None || Mike Torrez || 38–32
|- style="background:#fbb"
| 71 || June 25 || @ Expos || 0–5 || Steve Renko (5–7) || Dick Ruthven (2–6) || None || 18,122 || 38–33
|- style="background:#fbb"
| 72 || June 26 || @ Expos || 0–2 || Steve Rogers (8–8) || Steve Carlton (9–6) || None || 16,108 || 38–34
|- style="background:#bbb"
| – || June 28 || @ Pirates || colspan=6 | Postponed (rain); Makeup: June 30 as a traditional double-header
|- style="background:#fbb"
| 73 || June 29 || @ Pirates || 3–6 || Jerry Reuss (7–5) || Jim Lonborg (10–6) || None || 15,839 || 38–35
|- style="background:#fbb"
| 74 || June 30 (1) || @ Pirates || 8–11 || Ken Brett (10–4) || Steve Carlton (9–7) || None || see 2nd game || 38–36
|- style="background:#fbb"
| 75 || June 30 (2) || @ Pirates || 2–3 || Bruce Kison (3–3) || Ron Schueler (4–9) || None || 25,730 || 38–37
|-

|- style="background:#fbb"
| 76 || July 2 || @ Mets || 2–4 || Tom Seaver (5–6) || Dick Ruthven (2–7) || Jack Aker (1) || 20,724 || 38–38
|- style="background:#fbb"
| 77 || July 3 || @ Mets || 2–6 || Harry Parker (2–7) || Jim Lonborg (10–7) || None || Jim Lonborg || 38–39
|- style="background:#fbb"
| 78 || July 4 (1) || @ Mets || 3–5 || Jon Matlack (7–5) || Ron Schueler (4–10) || None || see 2nd game || 38–40
|- style="background:#bfb"
| 79 || July 4 (2) || @ Mets || 6–2 || Wayne Twitchell (3–1) || Ray Sadecki (4–4) || None || 26,811 || 39–40
|- style="background:#bfb"
| 80 || July 5 || Padres || 8–1 || Steve Carlton (10–7) || Bill Greif (3–11) || None || 42,332 || 40–40
|- style="background:#bfb"
| 81 || July 6 || Padres || 6–2 || Dick Ruthven (3–7) || Lowell Palmer (1–2) || Mac Scarce (5) || 22,111 || 41–40
|- style="background:#bfb"
| 82 || July 7 || Padres || 9–3 || Jim Lonborg (11–7) || Randy Jones (5–13) || None || 34,094 || 42–40
|- style="background:#fbb"
| 83 || July 8 || Dodgers || 0–4 || Andy Messersmith (9–2) || Ron Schueler (4–11) || None || 40,208 || 42–41
|- style="background:#fbb"
| 84 || July 9 || Dodgers || 4–8 || Al Downing (3–3) || Wayne Twitchell (3–2) || None || 34,320 || 42–42
|- style="background:#bfb"
| 85 || July 10 || Dodgers || 5–4 || Jesús Hernáiz (1–0) || Mike Marshall (11–4) || None || 33,812 || 43–42
|- style="background:#bfb"
| 86 || July 12 || @ Giants || 6–2 || Dick Ruthven (4–7) || Elías Sosa (5–5) || None || 3,329 || 44–42
|- style="background:#fbb"
| 87 || July 13 || @ Giants || 3–13 || Mike Caldwell (8–3) || Jim Lonborg (11–8) || None || 4,720 || 44–43
|- style="background:#bfb"
| 88 || July 14 (1) || @ Giants || 5–2 || Steve Carlton (11–7) || Ed Halicki (0–1) || None || see 2nd game || 45–43
|- style="background:#bfb"
| 89 || July 14 (2) || @ Giants || 7–4 || Wayne Twitchell (4–2) || Tom Bradley (7–10) || None || 9,239 || 46–43
|- style="background:#fbb"
| 90 || July 16 || @ Padres || 4–5 || Vicente Romo (5–4) || Jesús Hernáiz (1–1) || None || 7,927 || 46–44
|- style="background:#fbb"
| 91 || July 17 || @ Padres || 1–15 || Randy Jones (7–13) || Jim Lonborg (11–9) || None || 9,031 || 46–45
|- style="background:#bfb"
| 92 || July 18 || @ Padres || 8–5 || Ron Schueler (5–11) || Vicente Romo (5–5) || None || 8,196 || 47–45
|- style="background:#fbb"
| 93 || July 19 || @ Dodgers || 0–4 || Doug Rau (8–6) || Wayne Twitchell (4–3) || None || 53,160 || 47–46
|- style="background:#bfb"
| 94 || July 20 || @ Dodgers || 5–2 || Jesús Hernáiz (2–1) || Don Sutton (6–8) || None || 52,975 || 48–46
|- style="background:#bfb"
| 95 || July 21 || @ Dodgers || 2–1 || Jim Lonborg (12–9) || Al Downing (3–4) || None || 43,710 || 49–46
|- style="background:#bbcaff;"
| – || July 23 ||colspan="7" |1974 Major League Baseball All-Star Game at Three Rivers Stadium in Pittsburgh
|- style="background:#bfb"
| 96 || July 25 || @ Cubs || 10–2 || Steve Carlton (12–7) || Burt Hooton (3–9) || None || 13,849 || 50–46
|- style="background:#fbb"
| 97 || July 26 || @ Cubs || 7–10 || Rick Reuschel (10–7) || Jim Lonborg (12–10) || None || 14,701 || 50–47
|- style="background:#bfb"
| 98 || July 27 (1) || Pirates || 6–5 || Pete Richert (1–0) || Ken Brett (12–7) || None || see 2nd game || 51–47
|- style="background:#bfb"
| 99 || July 27 (2) || Pirates || 7–4 || Wayne Twitchell (5–3) || Bruce Kison (5–5) || Eddie Watt (6) || 55,066 || 52–47
|- style="background:#fbb"
| 100 || July 28 || Pirates || 3–4 || Dave Giusti (5–3) || Mac Scarce (3–5) || None || 34,049 || 52–48
|- style="background:#bfb"
| 101 || July 29 || Pirates || 13–1 || Steve Carlton (13–7) || Jerry Reuss (10–8) || None || 27,760 || 53–48
|- style="background:#fbb"
| 102 || July 30 || Cardinals || 3–4 || Al Hrabosky (5–1) || Jesús Hernáiz (2–2) || None || 33,382 || 53–49
|- style="background:#fbb"
| 103 || July 31 || Cardinals || 8–9 || Bob Gibson (6–9) || Dick Ruthven (4–8) || Al Hrabosky (4) || 33,431 || 53–50
|-

|- style="background:#bfb"
| 104 || August 1 || Expos || 6–4 || Wayne Twitchell (6–3) || Ernie McAnally (6–13) || None || 20,146 || 54–50
|- style="background:#fbb"
| 105 || August 2 || Expos || 2–3 || Steve Rogers (11–13) || Eddie Watt (1–1) || Chuck Taylor (8) || 21,068 || 54–51
|- style="background:#fbb"
| 106 || August 3 || @ Cardinals || 3–4 || Mike Garman (3–2) || Jim Lonborg (12–11) || None || 36,053 || 54–52
|- style="background:#bfb"
| 107 || August 4 (1) || @ Cardinals || 6–1 || Ron Schueler (6–11) || Alan Foster (5–7) || None || see 2nd game || 55–52
|- style="background:#fbb"
| 108 || August 4 (2) || @ Cardinals || 0–11 || John Curtis (6–10) || Dick Ruthven (4–9) || None || 48,245 || 55–53
|- style="background:#fbb"
| 109 || August 5 || @ Cardinals || 2–3 (13) || Mike Garman (4–2) || Pete Richert (1–1) || None || 33,476 || 55–54
|- style="background:#bfb"
| 110 || August 6 || Cubs || 8–3 || Steve Carlton (14–7) || Jim Todd (2–2) || None || 14,490 || 56–54
|- style="background:#bfb"
| 111 || August 7 || Cubs || 3–2 || Gene Garber (2–2) || Oscar Zamora (3–4) || None || 11,284 || 57–54
|- style="background:#bfb"
| 112 || August 8 || Cubs || 2–1 || Ron Schueler (7–11) || Bill Bonham (10–14) || Gene Garber (2) || 11,349 || 58–54
|- style="background:#fbb"
| 113 || August 9 || Braves || 2–3 (11) || Lew Krausse Jr. (3–2) || Mac Scarce (3–6) || None || 28,542 || 58–55
|- style="background:#fbb"
| 114 || August 10 || Braves || 4–11 || Phil Niekro (13–9) || Wayne Twitchell (6–4) || Max León (1) || 43,328 || 58–56
|- style="background:#fbb"
| 115 || August 11 || Braves || 5–6 || Tom House (5–2) || Steve Carlton (14–8) || None || 41,739 || 58–57
|- style="background:#bfb"
| 116 || August 12 || Giants || 4–1 || Jim Lonborg (13–11) || Ed Halicki (1–6) || None || 16,271 || 59–57
|- style="background:#bfb"
| 117 || August 13 || Giants || 6–5 || Dick Ruthven (5–9) || Jim Barr (10–6) || Ron Schueler (1) || 27,618 || 60–57
|- style="background:#fbb"
| 118 || August 14 || Giants || 4–6 || Elías Sosa (8–5) || Mac Scarce (3–7) || None || 24,061 || 60–58
|- style="background:#bfb"
| 119 || August 16 || @ Braves || 6–3 || Pete Richert (2–1) || Phil Niekro (13–10) || None || 12,686 || 61–58
|- style="background:#fbb"
| 120 || August 17 || @ Braves || 6–7 (12) || Tom House (6–2) || Mac Scarce (3–8) || None || 45,805 || 61–59
|- style="background:#bfb"
| 121 || August 18 || @ Braves || 7–4 || Dick Ruthven (6–9) || Ron Reed (8–7) || None || 11,407 || 62–59
|- style="background:#fbb"
| 122 || August 19 || @ Reds || 2–15 || Don Gullett (14–8) || Wayne Twitchell (6–5) || None || 21,806 || 62–60
|- style="background:#fbb"
| 123 || August 20 || @ Reds || 1–7 || Clay Kirby (8–7) || Ron Schueler (7–12) || None || 30,448 || 62–61
|- style="background:#bfb"
| 124 || August 21 || @ Reds || 10–3 || Jim Lonborg (14–11) || Tom Carroll (4–1) || None || 31,887 || 63–61
|- style="background:#fbb"
| 125 || August 23 || @ Astros || 0–1 || Larry Dierker (8–8) || Dick Ruthven (6–10) || None || 12,175 || 63–62
|- style="background:#fbb"
| 126 || August 24 || @ Astros || 0–1 || Dave Roberts (9–10) || Steve Carlton (14–9) || None || 12,215 || 63–63
|- style="background:#fbb"
| 127 || August 25 || @ Astros || 0–5 || Don Wilson (9–10) || Wayne Twitchell (6–6) || None || 11,405 || 63–64
|- style="background:#bfb"
| 128 || August 26 || Reds || 7–6 || Ron Schueler (8–12) || Clay Carroll (10–4) || None || 27,197 || 64–64
|- style="background:#fbb"
| 129 || August 27 || Reds || 0–3 || Jack Billingham (16–8) || Dick Ruthven (6–11) || None || 32,106 || 64–65
|- style="background:#fbb"
| 130 || August 28 || Reds || 3–4 || Will McEnaney (2–1) || Ron Schueler (8–13) || Dick Baney (1) || 31,535 || 64–66
|- style="background:#fbb"
| 131 || August 30 || Astros || 2–3 || Don Wilson (10–10) || Wayne Twitchell (6–7) || Ken Forsch (6) || 17,106 || 64–67
|- style="background:#bfb"
| 132 || August 31 || Astros || 10–6 || Larry Christenson (1–0) || J. R. Richard (1–1) || None || 35,257 || 65–67
|-

|- style="background:#bfb"
| 133 || September 1 || Astros || 8–1 || Dick Ruthven (7–11) || Tom Griffin (12–8) || None || 18,232 || 66–67
|- style="background:#fbb"
| 134 || September 2 (1) || @ Pirates || 4–7 || Jerry Reuss (15–9) || Steve Carlton (14–10) || None || see 2nd game || 66–68
|- style="background:#fbb"
| 135 || September 2 (2) || @ Pirates || 1–11 || Bruce Kison (7–7) || Ron Schueler (8–14) || None || 45,181 || 66–69
|- style="background:#fbb"
| 136 || September 3 || @ Pirates || 2–8 || Jim Rooker (11–10) || Wayne Twitchell (6–8) || None || 8,168 || 66–70
|- style="background:#bfb"
| 137 || September 5 || @ Cubs || 6–5 (11) || Ron Schueler (9–14) || Dave LaRoche (3–4) || Larry Christenson (1) || 1,943 || 67–70
|- style="background:#bfb"
| 138 || September 6 || @ Cubs || 4–3 || Dick Ruthven (8–11) || Burt Hooton (4–11) || None || 2,104 || 68–70
|- style="background:#fbb"
| 139 || September 7 || @ Cubs || 0–3 || Bill Bonham (11–18) || Steve Carlton (14–11) || None || 10,632 || 68–71
|- style="background:#bfb"
| 140 || September 8 || @ Cubs || 11–10 || Gene Garber (3–2) || Tom Dettore (1–3) || None || 14,564 || 69–71
|- style="background:#bfb"
| 141 || September 9 || @ Cardinals || 2–0 || Jim Lonborg (15–11) || John Curtis (8–13) || None || 27,801 || 70–71
|- style="background:#bfb"
| 142 || September 10 || @ Cardinals || 8–2 || Dick Ruthven (9–11) || Alan Foster (7–10) || None || 27,285 || 71–71
|- style="background:#bfb"
| 143 || September 11 || Pirates || 8–5 || Ron Schueler (10–14) || Ramón Hernández (2–2) || None || 21,117 || 72–71
|- style="background:#bfb"
| 144 || September 12 || Pirates || 6–4 || Gene Garber (4–2) || Bruce Kison (7–8) || None || 22,135 || 73–71
|- style="background:#fbb"
| 145 || September 13 || Cardinals || 3–7 (17) || Ray Bare (1–2) || Jesús Hernáiz (2–3) || None || 35,290 || 73–72
|- style="background:#fbb"
| 146 || September 14 || Cardinals || 2–9 || John Curtis (9–13) || Dick Ruthven (9–12) || None || 40,426 || 73–73
|- style="background:#fbb"
| 147 || September 15 || Cardinals || 1–3 || Bob Forsch (5–4) || Steve Carlton (14–12) || Al Hrabosky (9) || 30,142 || 73–74
|- style="background:#fbb"
| 148 || September 17 || Cubs || 2–4 || Tom Dettore (2–4) || Wayne Twitchell (6–9) || Dave LaRoche (4) || 10,152 || 73–75
|- style="background:#fbb"
| 149 || September 18 || Cubs || 2–5 || Steve Stone (8–5) || Jim Lonborg (15–12) || Ken Frailing (1) || 8,133 || 73–76
|- style="background:#fbb"
| 150 || September 19 || Cubs || 4–7 || Burt Hooton (6–11) || Ron Schueler (10–15) || Dave LaRoche (5) || 8,672 || 73–77
|- style="background:#bfb"
| 151 || September 20 || @ Expos || 10–2 || Steve Carlton (15–12) || Steve Renko (11–15) || None || 8,166 || 74–77
|- style="background:#bbb"
| – || September 21 || @ Expos || colspan=6 | Postponed (rain); Makeup: September 22 as a traditional double-header
|- style="background:#bfb"
| 152 || September 22 (1) || @ Expos || 3–2 || Jim Lonborg (16–12) || Steve Rogers (14–21) || Gene Garber (3) || see 2nd game || 75–77
|- style="background:#fbb"
| 153 || September 22 (2) || @ Expos || 5–8 || Mike Torrez (14–8) || Dick Ruthven (9–13) || Dale Murray (7) || 11,183 || 75–78
|- style="background:#bfb"
| 154 || September 24 || Mets || 6–3 || Steve Carlton (16–12) || Hank Webb (0–2) || Gene Garber (4) || 11,165 || 76–78
|- style="background:#bfb"
| 155 || September 25 (1) || Mets || 6–2 || Ron Schueler (11–15) || Tom Seaver (11–10) || Larry Christenson (2) || see 2nd game || 77–78
|- style="background:#bfb"
| 156 || September 25 (2) || Mets || 6–3 || Tom Underwood (1–0) || Randy Sterling (1–1) || Gene Garber (5) || 16,221 || 78–78
|- style="background:#fbb"
| 157 || September 27 || @ Expos || 0–2 || Mike Torrez (15–8) || Jim Lonborg (16–13) || None || 8,179 || 78–79
|- style="background:#fbb"
| 158 || September 28 || @ Expos || 1–3 || Steve Renko (12–16) || Steve Carlton (16–13) || None || 6,499 || 78–80
|- style="background:#fbb"
| 159 || September 29 || @ Expos || 3–6 || Dennis Blair (11–7) || Ron Schueler (11–16) || Dale Murray (10) || 23,326 || 78–81
|- style="background:#fbb"
| 160 || September 30 || @ Mets || 2–5 || Jerry Koosman (15–11) || Larry Christenson (1–1) || None || 5,931 || 78–82
|-

|- style="background:#bfb"
| 161 || October 1 || @ Mets || 2–1 || Jim Lonborg (17–13) || Tom Seaver (11–11) || None || 5,341 || 79–82
|- style="background:#bfb"
| 162 || October 2 || @ Mets || 3–2 (10) || Gene Garber' (5–2) || Jon Matlack (13–15) || None || 5,383 || 80–82
|-

 Roster 

 Player stats 

 Batting 

 Starters by position Note: Pos = Position; G = Games played; AB = At bats; H = Hits; Avg. = Batting average; HR = Home runs; RBI = Runs batted in Other batters Note: G = Games played; AB = At bats; H = Hits; Avg. = Batting average; HR = Home runs; RBI = Runs batted in Pitching 

 Starting pitchers Note: G = Games pitched; IP = Innings pitched; W = Wins; L = Losses; ERA = Earned run average; SO = Strikeouts Other pitchers Note: G = Games pitched; IP = Innings pitched; W = Wins; L = Losses; ERA = Earned run average; SO = Strikeouts Relief pitchers Note: G = Games pitched; W = Wins; L = Losses; SV = Saves; ERA = Earned run average; SO = Strikeouts Farm system 

 Notes 

 References 
1974 Philadelphia Phillies season at Baseball Reference''

Philadelphia Phillies seasons
Philadelphia Phillies season
Philadelph